The Old Sullivan County Courthouse was the first county courthouse of Sullivan County, New Hampshire. Construction of the brick building in 1825-26 was instrumental in securing Newport's status as the shire town of the county when it was established in 1827. The building was listed on the National Register of Historic Places (as "Sullivan County Courthouse") in 1985. The building is now in commercial use.

Description and history
The Old Sullivan County Courthouse is located in downtown Newport, on a rise east of Main Street, behind later civic buildings and across Main Street from a cluster of later 19th-century commercial blocks. Its main block is a -story brick structure, with a gabled roof and end chimneys. It has a five-bay front facade, with the center bay taken up by an entry topped by a tower. The entry is two stories, with the main entrance framed by sidelight windows and a half-round transom window. The tower is a wood-frame structure with a blank square stage at its base, followed by an open belfry with arched openings, and topped by a cupola. A brick two-story wing extends to the northeast of the main block.

The courthouse was built in 1825-26 (prior to the establishment of Sullivan County, which occurred in 1827) with funding from the town, and was instrumental in the choice of Newport as the new county's seat. The building served as a county court and town hall until 1873, when it was turned over to the town. It was used by the town as a school until 1896, when it was leased to the local Grange chapter.

See also
Newport Opera House, also used as a county courthouse

References

Courthouses on the National Register of Historic Places in New Hampshire
Federal architecture in New Hampshire
Buildings and structures completed in 1826
Buildings and structures in Sullivan County, New Hampshire
1826 establishments in New Hampshire
National Register of Historic Places in Sullivan County, New Hampshire
Newport, New Hampshire
Historic district contributing properties in New Hampshire
County courthouses in New Hampshire